Janet Canoy (born August 5, 1945 in Lebanon, Oregon), known professionally as Jo Collins, is Playboy magazine's Playmate of the Month for December 1964 and Playmate of the Year for 1965. Her original pictorial was photographed by Mario Casilli. 

She was discovered by Playboy while working as a page for the Queen for a Day TV game show. She went on to work at the Playboy Clubs as a Bunny, and later as a Bunny Mother.

Jo, who is of Norwegian and Spanish descent, was married to  baseball player Bo Belinsky for five years (1970 to 1975).

She was nicknamed “G.I. Jo” for her United Service Organizations tours to Vietnam to entertain the troops during the Vietnam War. She first went to Vietnam to deliver a copy of Playboy in person to a lieutenant named Jack Price of the 173rd Airborne Brigade, whom during his final months at the United States Military Academy had availed himself to an offer to purchase a lifetime subscription to the magazine and the first issue would be personally delivered by a Playmate. After commissioning, Price was sent to Vietnam and wounded in action, and was tracked down by the magazine who sent Collins to honor the terms of the offer, which did not include geographic limitations.  

In December 1979 Jo posed for the "Playmates Forever!" pictorial. In 1998 Jo reunited with Jack Price for an online interview with Playboy fans.

Film and television appearances 
 Fireball 500 (1966) .... Leander Fan
 Lord Love a Duck (1966) .... Kitten
 Sergeant Dead Head (1965) .... Gail
 How to Stuff a Wild Bikini (1965) .... Beach Girl
 Ski Party (1965) (uncredited) .... Jo

See also
 List of people in Playboy 1960–1969

References

External links 
 

1945 births
Living people
People from Lebanon, Oregon
1960s Playboy Playmates
Playboy Playmates of the Year
American people of Norwegian descent
American people of Spanish descent